The Licence Ouverte / Open Licence is a French open license published on October 18, 2011 by  for open data from the State of France. The license was designed to be compatible with Creative Commons Licenses, Open Government License, and the Open Data Commons Attribution License. Information released under the Open License may be re-used with attribution, such as a URL or other identification of the producer. The Open License is used by the city of Bordeaux, France to release data sets.

References

External links 

 License Ouverte by Etalab

Open data
Licensing
2012 introductions